De Scheveningen Lighthouse is a lighthouse in Scheveningen, Netherlands. It was designed by Quirinus Harder and activated finished in 1875.

History

In the 16th century Scheveningen had a lighthouse already, and the church collected money from the ships using it. It was elevated in 1850, and equipped with a copper cupola and a new light. In the 1870s, Dutch lighthouse designer Quirinus Harder got the assignment for a new lighthouse.

The lighthouse is made of cast iron and consists of nine segments. At the foot of the tower is one house for the supervisor and four more for the lighthouse keeper. The original light rotated in a mercury bath, which was replaced in the 1960s by an electrical system.

See also

 List of lighthouses in the Netherlands
 Cast-iron architecture

References

External links

Lighthouses completed in 1875
Lighthouses in South Holland
Rijksmonuments in The Hague
Towers in The Hague